Novouzensky District is an administrative and municipal district (raion), one of the thirty-eight in Saratov Oblast, Russia. It is located in the southeast of the oblast. Its administrative center is the town of Novouzensk. As of the 2010 Census, the total population of the district was 32,248, with the population of Novouzensk accounting for 52.8% of that number.

History
The district was established in 1928 within Pugachyov Okrug of Lower Volga Krai. When okrugs were abolished in 1930, it was subordinated directly to Lower Volga Krai. In 1934, when Lower Volga Krai was split into Saratov and Stalingrad Krais, the district remained a part of the former. In 1936, Saratov Krai was transformed into modern Saratov Oblast, and the district has remained a part of it ever since.

References

Notes

Sources

Districts of Saratov Oblast
States and territories established in 1928
